Christy Martin was an Irish footballer who played in the Scottish League with both Bo'ness and Falkirk. Martin was also a dual international and played for both Ireland teams - the IFA XI and the FAI XI.

Club career
Martin first came to prominence as a goalscorer with Bo'ness, scoring 34 goals during the 1924–25 season.  
His 29 goals during the in 1926–27 season helped Bo'ness win the Scottish Second Division title and gain promotion to the First Division. The Saturday before he made his debut for the FAI XI, he scored a hat-trick for Bo'ness against Clydebank.   

Bo'ness lasted just a single season in the First Division. With Martin limited to just seven goals from 37 games, they finished 19th and were relegated back to Second Division. Martin also briefly played with Falkirk and had a spell with Brooklyn Wanderers, playing only one game, in the American Soccer League before returning to finish career at  Bo'ness.

Irish international
When Martin began his international career in 1925 there were, in effect, two Ireland teams, chosen by two rival associations. Both associations, the Northern Ireland - based IFA and the Irish Free State - based FAI claimed jurisdiction over the whole of Ireland and selected players from the whole island. As a result, several notable Irish players from this era, including Martin, played for both teams.

IFA XI
Martin made his one and only appearances for the IFA XI on 28 February 1925 in a 3-0 defeat against Scotland at Windsor Park.

FAI XI
Martin made his only appearance for the FAI XI on 23 April 1927 in a 2-1 defeat against Italy B at Lansdowne Road. 
 He was the first player from a Scottish League club to play for an FAI XI.

Honours

Bo'ness F.C.

Scottish Second Division
Winners  1926-27: 1

References

External links
   Northern Ireland's Footballing Greats

People from Athlone
Sportspeople from County Westmeath
Republic of Ireland association footballers
Pre-1950 IFA international footballers
Irish Free State international footballers
Dual Irish international footballers
American Soccer League (1921–1933) players
Bo'ness F.C. players
Brooklyn Wanderers players
Falkirk F.C. players
Year of birth missing
Year of death missing
Scottish Football League players
Association football wingers